Andrew Jackson Bednar was an American professional baseball pitcher. He played in Major League Baseball (MLB) during the 1930 and 1931 seasons for the Pittsburgh Pirates. He died in 1937 at the age of 29 in Graham, Texas, after an auto accident.

References

External links

1908 births
1937 deaths
Major League Baseball pitchers
Pittsburgh Pirates players
Baseball players from Illinois
People from Streator, Illinois
McCook Generals players